Piz Julier (German) is a mountain of the Albula Alps, overlooking the Julier Pass, in the Swiss canton of Graubünden. With a height of 3,380 metres above sea level, Piz Julier is the second highest peak (after Piz Calderas) of the group between the Julier Pass and the Albula Pass.

Piz Julier can be summited by experienced hikers. From the heights of St. Moritz, a trail leads to Fuorcla Albana (2,870 metres), the pass between Piz Julier and Piz Albana. From there a via ferrata, named Senda Enferrada leads to the summit.

References

External links

 Piz Julier on Hikr
 Piz Julier on Summitpost

Mountains of Switzerland
Mountains of Graubünden
Mountains of the Alps
Alpine three-thousanders
Silvaplana
St. Moritz